Henry Napier Bruce Erskine, CSI (7 September 1831 – 4 December 1893) was a member of the Indian Civil Service.

A son of William Erskine, he arrived in Bombay in 1853. He became collector and magistrate of Nasik in 1869, commissioner of the northern division of Bombay from 1877 to 1879, and Commissioner in Sind from 1879 to 1887. He was appointed a CSI in 1887.

In retirement, he died at Cran Hill, Great Malvern, Worcestershire in 1893.

References

Indian Civil Service (British India) officers
1893 deaths
1831 births
People from Livingston, West Lothian
Companions of the Order of the Star of India